Liyana de Silva (born 2 October 1985) was a Sri Lankan cricketer. He was a left-handed batsman and right-arm medium-fast bowler who played for Colts Cricket Club. He was born in Colombo.

De Silva made a single first-class appearance for the side, during the 2005–06 season, against Tamil Union Cricket and Athletic Club. From the lower order, he scored 12 runs in the only innings in which he batted.

External links
Liyana de Silva at CricketArchive 

1985 births
Living people
Sri Lankan cricketers
Colts Cricket Club cricketers
Cricketers from Colombo